The beluga, also known as the beluga sturgeon or great sturgeon (Huso huso), is a species of anadromous fish in the sturgeon family (Acipenseridae) of order  Acipenseriformes. It is found primarily in the Caspian and Black Sea basins, and formerly in the Adriatic Sea. Based on maximum size, it is the third-most-massive living species of bony fish. Heavily fished for the female's valuable roe, known as beluga caviar, wild populations have been greatly reduced by overfishing and poaching, leading IUCN to classify the species as critically endangered.

Etymology
The common name for the sturgeon, as for the unrelated beluga whale, is derived from the Russian word белый (belyj), meaning "white," probably referring to the extensive pale colour on the flanks and belly in beluga compared to that of other sturgeons.

Description

Huso huso shows typical characteristics of other sturgeon, such as an elongated body, heterocercal tail, partially cartilaginous skeleton, naked skin and longitudinal series of scutes.

The dorsal fin has 48 to 81 soft rays, and the anal fin, much shorter, has 22 to 41 soft rays. There are five in a series of longitudinal scutes: dorsal (one series, 9-17 scutes), lateral (two series, one per side, 28-60 scutes each) and ventral series (two series, one per side, 7-14 scutes each). The surface of the skin is covered by fine denticles. The rostrum is conical and contains numerous sensory pits on both ventral and dorsal surfaces. The mouth is large, crescent-shaped and protractile, with the upper lip continuous while the lower lip is interrupted by a large gap. The barbels are laterally compressed with foliate appendages, arranged in two pairs, originating midway or closer to the mouth than to the tip of the snout.  

However, during growth, the beluga sturgeon show evident morphologic changes: 

 Juveniles are slender, and the head is quite narrow with a mouth ventrally placed but projecting upward. The snout is thin and pointed (almost half of the head), scutes are evident, back and flancs are dark grey or black and the belly is white. 

 Adults are heavy-set, spindle-shaped, large and humpbacked. The head is massive with a very large protractile mouth that gradually moves in an almost frontal position during growth. The snout is quite short (one-third to one-quarter of the head), and scutes gradually undergo absorption and decrease in number with age. Colouring is blue-grey or dark brown, with silver or grey flancs and white bell. The dark dorsum contrasts strongly against the rest of the body;
 Very old specimens are stocky, with a large head and an enormous mouth.

Size 

Among all extant bony fishes, the beluga sturgeon rivals the ocean sunfish (Mola sp.) as the most massive fish and is the second-longest bony fish after the giant oarfish (Regalecus glesne). It is the largest freshwater fish in the world. The beluga also rivals the great white shark (Carcharodon carcharias) and the greenland shark (Somniosus microcephalus) for the title of largest actively predatory fish.

Several other records of aged sturgeon exceed .

Beluga of such great sizes are very old (continuing to grow throughout life) and have become increasingly rare in recent decades because of heavy fishing of the species. The female beluga is typically 20% larger than the male.

Biology

Spawning
Like most sturgeons, the beluga is anadromous, migrating upstream in rivers to spawn on clean, hard substrate, which offers both support and cover to their sticky and adhesive eggs. Spawning biology and development of larval stages of the sturgeon, the most ancient fish of the Danube, co-evolved with the formation of the Danube valley, resulting in very different survival strategies in its early life stages. This appears to explain why different individuals of the same long-migratory species spawn as far upstream as 1,700 km upstream, while others spawn just 100 km. To make the long journey to very distant spawning grounds, the sturgeon adapted a two-stage migration strategy, beginning in the fall when they enter the Danube River overwinter in the river and the second stage is their spawning which takes place in the spring the river in fall and staying over winter in reaches of the river offering adequate substrate and water-flow resting conditions. Very few locations of existing wintering and spawning grounds for sturgeon are presently known in the lower Danube, and none are known to exist in the river's upper reaches. The same situation concerns nursery sites upon which young sturgeon depend during their journey to the Black Sea.

Males attain sexual maturity at 12–16 years of age, whereas females do so at 16–22 years. They will spawn every four to seven years. At one time, beluga sturgeons could migrate up to  upriver to spawn, but dams in almost every major tributary that they utilize have impeded historic spawning routes. The female lays her eggs on gravel from  underwater. Thereafter, the larvae usually subsist on benthic invertebrates, but when reaching at least  in length, they will switch to a fish-based diet. While swimming back to the ocean, the young sturgeon may cover up to  a day.

Diet

Huso huso is a pelagic predator whose local distribution is not influenced by the nature of the substrates, unlike with most of the sturgeons that show demersal attitude. The prey is sucked into the mouth opening extremely quickly.

Juveniles feed on benthic invertebrates in rivers and shallow coastal waters, where they grow quickly. At the length of 8–10 cm, they become largely piscivorous.
Different diets have been observed throughout the distribution range of beluga sturgeon, as well as according to spawners' migration stage. Adults mainly eat a great diversity of large fish (73% of the diet). Additional food items may include molluscs and crustaceans, aquatic birds and young seals (Caspian seals, Pusa caspica). 

The piscivorous diet of beluga sturgeon tends to change with age: in the Caspian Sea, it mainly consists of Clupeonella sp. for juveniles smaller than 40 cm, different species of Gobiidae for fish ranging between 40 and 280 cm and then mullets, Alosa sp. and other sturgeons for the largest. 

In brackish environments of the Ponto-Caspian basin, the genera Alosa, Aspius and Engraulis are the preferred prey. In estuaries and rivers of the same area, migrating spawners eat various cyprinids, mainly Cyprinus carpio and Rutilus rutilus, Sander lucioperca and, among sturgeons, Acipenser ruthenus is the main prey.

Little is known about the diet of the Adriatic population. It has been reported that in marine and brackish environments, adult H. huso forage primarily on molluscs (Cephalopoda, of which common cuttlefish, Sepia officinalis, and European squid, Loligo vulgaris, are particularly common in the Adriatic Sea) and fish belonging to the families Gadidae, Pleuronectidae, Gobiidae, Clupeidae, Scombridae and Mugilidae, but also on big crustaceans; in the rivers, they feed mainly on local Cyprinidae.

Uses 

Beluga caviar is considered a delicacy worldwide. The flesh of the beluga is not particularly renowned, but it is a hearty white meat similar to that of swordfish. Beluga caviar has long been scarce and expensive and the fish's endangered status has made its caviar even more expensive throughout the world.

The beluga's air bladder is said to make the best isinglass.

Status 
IUCN classifies the beluga as critically endangered. It is a protected species listed in Appendix III of the Bern Convention, and its trade is restricted under CITES Appendix II. The Mediterranean population is strongly protected under Appendix II of the Bern Convention, prohibiting any intentional killing of these fish.

The United States Fish and Wildlife Service has banned imports of beluga caviar and other beluga products from the Caspian Sea since 6 October 2005, after listing beluga sturgeon under the U.S. Endangered Species Act.

Repopulation efforts 
In July 2016, Sturgeon Aquafarms in Bascom, Florida became the first and only facility in the world to obtain a permit exemption for the sale of beluga sturgeon and its caviar in the U.S. Since 2017, the company has assisted in beluga sturgeon repopulation efforts across the world by providing over 160,000 fertilized eggs to the Caspian Sea region.

Following a World Wildlife Fund crowdfunding appeal, over 7,000 three month-old beluga sturgeons were released into the Danube River. Despite repopulation efforts, the beluga sturgeon continues to face poaching threats. In 2021, two Romanian men in Grindu, Ialomita were caught trying to smuggle a 140 kilogram, 2.5-metre beluga sturgeon in a wagon; the fish was later safely returned to the river.

References

External links
 
 Annex II of the Convention on the Conservation of European Wildlife and Naturaabitats. Revised 1 March 2002.

Commercial fish
Sturgeons
Fish of Asia
Fish of Russia
Fish of Azerbaijan
Fish of Iran
Fish of Central Asia
Fish of Europe
Fish of Georgia (country)
Fish of Turkey
Fish of the Adriatic Sea
Fish of the Black Sea
Fish of the Caspian Sea
Fish described in 1758
Taxa named by Carl Linnaeus